Ice Age: Scrat Tales is an American computer-animated series of shorts produced by Blue Sky Studios, which premiered on Disney+ on April 13, 2022. It is a spin-off of the Ice Age franchise and the first series of shorts in the franchise. It is also the final production from Blue Sky Studios to be released by 20th Century Studios following the studio's closure on April 10, 2021. The series focuses on Scrat, a saber-toothed squirrel who discovers that he has a son. It received generally positive reviews from critics with praise for its animation, humor, music, and light-hearted tone, with critics and audiences alike also considering it as a good sendoff to the studio.

Cast
 Chris Wedge as Scrat
 Kari Wahlgren as Baby Scrat

Production

Development
On February 22, 2022, which would have been Blue Sky Studios's 35th anniversary, the series was officially announced, with a release date of April 13, 2022. A teaser poster, the cast and crew, and promotional stills were also revealed and provided in press reports.

Animation
Unlike most Blue Sky Studios projects which use the studio's in-house software CGI Studio, the series was produced using Pixar RenderMan, becoming the first and only confirmed Blue Sky Studios production to utilize the software, as CGI Studio was being phased out in favor of RenderMan. In an interview, Michael Knapp added that as a result, they had to remodel Scrat by re-furring, re-materializing and re-rigging the character. Production was also impacted by the COVID-19 pandemic, forcing animators to work remotely. He also went on to state that they were aware of The Ice Age Adventures of Buck Wild being produced without the involvement of the studio around the same time production on the series occurred.

Music
Batu Sener composed the musical score, with  John Powell composing the end titles; Sener was also a composer on the Ice Age film The Ice Age Adventures of Buck Wild (2022), while Powell composed the Ice Age films The Meltdown (2006), Dawn of the Dinosaurs (2009), and Continental Drift (2012). The soundtrack was released on March 25, 2022, by Hollywood Records.

Release
The series was released as a Disney+ original series on April 13, 2022.

"The End"
On April 13, the same release date that had been announced for the series, an unlisted video, simply titled The End, was uploaded by a former Blue Sky Studios employee onto YouTube, whose account went under the name Finale. The short, which was separate from the series, ended the infamous running gag by featuring Scrat finally achieving his dream of eating an acorn with no catches, and then scurrying off screen, presumably to find adventure elsewhere. The short was allegedly the final piece of animation made by Blue Sky Studios before their closure in 2021, made by a small team of animators to serve as "a send off on their own terms." The scene quickly went viral on the Internet which led to widespread coverage from major news sites, as they had reported that it finally left closure to Scrat's 20-year on-screen battle, in-which he ultimately accomplished his goal.

Episodes
Every short is directed by Donnie Long, but co-directors are credited alongside him.

Reception

Critical response
Joel Keller of Decider found the series to be entertaining and family friendly, stating, "There are enough funny moments in Ice Age: Scrat Tales to make it worth the pretty brief time commitment, especially if you're watching it with your kids." Polly Conway of Common Sense Media rated the series 3 out of 5 stars, found agreeable the depiction of positive messages and role models, citing compassion and caring across the character of Scrat, and complimented the humor of the series, writing, "Chaotic critter becomes a parent in funny, violent shorts."

Awards and nominations
Batu Sener's score was nominated for the Best Original Score in a TV Show/Limited Series category at the 13th Hollywood Music in Media Awards ceremony in November 2022, but lost to 1883's score by Brian Tyler and Breton Vivian.

Notes

References

External links
 
 
 

2020s American animated television series
2022 American television series debuts
2022 American television series endings
American children's animated comedy television series
American computer-animated television series
American animated television spin-offs
Animated television shows based on films
Disney+ original programming
Disney animated television series
English-language television shows
Animated television series about squirrels
Ice Age (franchise)
Television series impacted by the COVID-19 pandemic
Television shows scored by John Powell